Stay Out of Order is the third album by street punk band The Casualties. It was released in 2000.

Track listing 
No Way Out
Proud to Be Punk
Street Punk
Fight for Your Life
Time to Think
Violence
Same Fucking Song
Just Another Lie
Authority Is Dead
Preachers
Way of Life
Society's Fodder (Riot Squad Cover)
Hidden Track (starts at time 6:14 on last track): Dead Cities (The Exploited cover)

References

2000 albums
The Casualties albums